KFVT-LD, virtual channel 34 (UHF digital channel 27)  is a low-powered television station that is licensed to and serving Wichita, Kansas. The station is owned by Sunrise, Florida-based DTV America, and operated by INNOVATE Corp. (via the HC2 Broadcasting brand) through a Local marketing agreement.

History
The station signed on the air on January 26, 1994 as K61GC under ownership of Great Plains Television. The station's call letters were changed to KFVT-LP on February 28, 2003, and then to KFVT-LD on August 17, 2016. DTV America Corporation became KFVT's owner in 2015, with HC2 Broadcasting taking operations.

For most of its history, the station was a translator of then independent station KSBI of Oklahoma City, Oklahoma (later became a MyNetworkTV affiliate in 2012). This ended with the station began running Soul of the South programming in 2014, possibly due to the area already having a MyNetworkTV affiliate, which was KMTW, Soul of the South soon Was replaced with Movies!. The station's second and third subchannels became available in December 2015. The second subchannel is a test pattern, and the third one provides programming from The Country Network. In 2016, a fourth subchannel was launched to carry the Sonlife Broadcasting Network.

Digital channels
The station's digital signal is multiplexed:

References

External links

DTV America
HC2 Broadcasting

Innovate Corp.
FVT-LD
FVT-LD
Television channels and stations established in 1994